USS Louisiana, was a sloop built in New Orleans in 1812 and she played a vital role in the defense of Louisiana during the War of 1812 between the United States and the United Kingdom.

Career
Originally built as a merchant ship for the cost of $15,500, the USS Louisiana displaced 341 tons, and rated sixteen 24-pounder guns. She measured ninety-nine feet, six inches on the deck, beam of twenty-eight feet, and a fourteen foot deep hold. Louisiana was unmanned at the start of the campaign, and commanded by Captain Charles C. B. Thompson. From 23 December 1814 to 8 January 1815, the sloop Louisiana pounded advancing British troops, providing naval gunfire support for General Andrew Jackson's forces.  When British troops advanced up river beyond the range of the deadly cannon fire of the Louisiana, the crew did not let the absence of wind deter their support.  Crewmembers waded ashore with mooring lines and towed their sloop up river against the currents of the Mississippi River to re-engage.  The Louisiana was credited with playing a key role in the defeat of the British and keeping the valuable port of New Orleans in American hands.

References

Sloops of the United States Navy
War of 1812 ships of the United States
1812 ships